Amazonentulus is a genus of proturans in the family Acerentomidae.

Species
 Amazonentulus amazonicus (Nosek, 1972)
 Amazonentulus brasilianus (Nosek, 1973)
 Amazonentulus hangmannarum (Tuxen, 1976)
 Amazonentulus ovei (Tuxen, 1976)

References

Protura
Fauna of South America